The Socialist Unity Centre of India (Communist) or SUCI(C), previously called the Socialist Unity Centre of India and "Socialist Unity Centre", is an anti-revisionist Marxist-Leninist communist party in India. The party was founded by Shibdas Ghosh, Nihar Mukherjee and others in 1948.

Ideology
SUCI(C) is a communist party in India, and follows a Marxist-Leninist ideological line formulated by Shibdas Ghosh. The party rejects political ideas such as glasnost and perestroika as revisionist, and claims to uphold the original intent of Karl Marx, Friedrich Engels, Vladimir Lenin, Joseph Stalin, Mao Zedong, and the thoughts of Ghosh.

SUCI(C) holds that India is a capitalist country with monopoly capitalism and imperialist trends. In line with that analysis, the party works toward a socialist revolution, rather than a people's democratic revolution (like the Communist Party of India (Marxist)), a national democratic revolution (like the Communist Party of India) or a new democratic revolution (like the Naxalites).

SUCI(C) leadership emphasizes the qualitative upliftment of party cadres, workers of mass-organisations and supporters, by both theoretical study of Marxism-Leninism-Shibdas Ghosh Thought and the practical application of such knowledge in the day-to-day life of party workers. In various publications of the party, SUCI upholds the proletarian cultural standard, which, according to the leadership, should be achieved by the cadres, before they can lead the masses in the Socialist Revolution.

The 1st SUCI Party Congress was held in Kolkata in 1988. The 2nd party congress was held from 11 to 17 November 2009 in Ramlila Maidan, New Delhi attended by thousands of participants from 22 states and observers from several foreign countries. The current political line of the party was formulated in the 2nd party congress. The party's name was changed from Socialist Unity Centre of India (SUCI) to Socialist Unity Centre of India (Communist) [SUCI (C)] at the second party congress.

Parliamentary politics
From its inception, SUCI took part in parliamentary elections and was part of the United Front governments in West Bengal in 1967–1969 and 1969–1970 together with CPI(M) and others. The party had a Member of Parliament (MP) in the 4th Lok Sabha from Jaynagar. The SUCI had presence in the legislative assemblies of Assam, Bihar and Orissa at various times. In the 2004 Lok Sabha elections SUCI launched 56 candidates, 30 of them from West Bengal. In the 2009 Lok Sabha elections SUCI declared 40 candidates from 12 states.

Until 2014, Tarun Mandal, representing Jaynagar in West Bengal, was party's sole and last MP. After 2014 Lok Sabha and 2016 Vidhan Sabha elections, it has no MP or MLA in India.

Current situation
Around 45 SUCI(C) members live in communes wherein they lead a simple life style. Day-to-day upkeep of the commune and the well being of the children of party members living in the communes are taken care by the shared efforts of party members. Major income of the party is from box collection in the streets and house to house collection; members who are employed hand in their salaries to the party. The party contests elections with the money collected through this transparent fund raising method.

The stronghold of the party is in the South 24 Parganas district of West Bengal, in areas such as Jaynagar Majilpur where it controls certain municipalities.

SUCI(C) is actively involved in the ongoing anti-Special Economic Zone movements in India. The most notable of these movements that the party is active in are:
The Singur movement against the SEZ for the Tata Group's car factory.
The Nandigram movement against the SEZ for the Salim Group's chemical hub. SUCI(C) is one of the main backers of the Bhumi Uchhed Pratirodh Committee.
The Moolampally (Cochin, Kerala) land evictees agitation for an appropriate rehabilitation package. The general convener of the Moolampally agitation is Francis Kalathunkal, the local secretary of SUCI(C).
The party is also actively involved in the agitation of landless in Chengara (Pathanamthitta, Kerala) called Chengara Samaram in popular media.
The anti-Posco movement in Orissa.

In 2008, the party had formed a temporary political front in West Bengal with All India Trinamool Congress to fight the Communist Party of India (Marxist) on an agreement that the alliance will maintain equidistance from the Indian National Congress and the Bharatiya Janata Party.

The party won the Jaynagar Lok Sabha constituency in the 2009 general elections with a majority of 53,676 votes.

Campaigns
The Gherao principle was introduced as a formal mode of protest in the trade union sector by Subodh Banarjee, who was a central committee member of SUCI and the PWD and Labor Minister in the 1967 and 1969 United Front Governments in West Bengal, respectively.

One of the major campaigns of the party in West Bengal has been its agitations against the educational policy of the Left Front state government. The decision of the Left Front government to remove the English language from primary education sparked a mass movement led by the SUCI for the reinstatement of English.

Below is a chronological list of campaigns organised by the SUCI(C) in West Bengal:
1953: Tram fare protest movement was organised by the SUCI.
1954: In 1954, the SUCI organised the teachers' movement.
1956: Banga bihar sanjukti birodhi andolan.
1958: Students' movement was organised by the party.
1959: The SUCI organised food movement.
1967: Another food movement was led by the party.
1979: The SUCI organised a movement against various decisions taken by the Government of India.
1980: The SUCI organised Bhasha andolan against the Government of West Bengal which continues till now.
1983: A movement was led by the party against bus fare hike.
1988: First Party Congress in Kolkata (24–29 March)
1990: Another movement was organised by the 13 Left Parties [COI(ML), CPI(ML)ND and others] along with SUCI against the Government of West Bengal for bus fare hike and a Bangla bandh in September to protest against the death of Madhai Halder, a party supporter killed in police firing at the Esplanade on 31 August 1990. This was the first bandh.
1991: A protest was led by the organisation against electricity price hike.
1991: The SUCI organised a movement against the state education policy.
1998: Bangla bandh on 3 February in order to bring back English at the primary education. This was the second bandh.
2000: The SUCI organised a protest movement demanding English as a compulsory subject at primary education.
2002: A protest was organised against the decision of the Government of West Bengal to increase hospital fee and the increase in electricity charges by the Calcutta Electric Supply Corporation and West Bengal State Electricity Board. This was the third bandh.
2006-ongoing: The Anti SEZ movements in Singur and Nandigram.
2008: 21 12 April-hour statewide shutdown in West Bengal jointly called by the Trinamool Congress and SUCI.
2011: The movement against anti eviction drive at Ranchi, Jharkhand. Forming a public Committee "BASTI BACHAO SANGRASH SAMITI". Lakhs of people protested against government forceful campaign.

Leadership
Provash Ghosh is the current leader of the party. He was elected as the General Secretary of the party by the central committee on 4 March 2010.

After Shibdas Ghosh's death in 1976, Nihar Mukherjee, a co-founder of SUCI, became the General Secretary. Mukherjee died of cardiac arrest on 18 February 2010 at Kolkata.
The central committee members of the party are:
Provash Ghosh (General Secretary & Politburo member)
Manik Mukherjee (Politburo member)
Asit Bhattacharya (Politburo member)
Ranjit Dhar (Politburo member)
Yakub Pailan (died on 14 June 2014) 
Debaprasad Sarkar
Kalyan Chowdhury
C.K Lukose (Politburo member; died on 13 Feb 2019) 
K. Radhakrishna
Gopal Kundu
Soumen Bose
Satyawan
Sankar Saha
Chhaya Mukherjee
The incumbent central committee and politburo was elected in the 2nd party congress.

Secretaries of the State Committees of the party are:
Assam: Chandralekha Das 
Bihar: Shiv Shankar
Haryana: Satyawan
Karnataka: K. Uma
Kerala: V Venugopal (Kerala State Committee)
Madhya Pradesh: Pratap Samal
Orissa: Durjati Das
Uttar Pradesh: V.N. Singh
West Bengal:  Chandidas Bhattacharya

Secretaries of the State Organising Committees are:
Delhi: Pran Kumar Sharma
Andhra Pradesh: B.S.Amarnath
Tamil Nadu: Rengasamy
Telangana: Ch.Murahari
Gujarat: Dwarika Nath Rath
Rajasthan: 
Punjab: Aminder Pal Singh (Incharge)
Jharkhand: Robin Samajpati
Tripura: Arun Bhowmik
The MP of the party is:
Dr. Tarun Mandal: Jaynagar (Lok Sabha constituency), (2009–2014) West Bengal

The MLA of the party is:
Dr. Tarun Kanti Naskar : Jaynagar (Vidhan Sabha constituency),(2011–2016) West Bengal

Former Legislators of SUCI(C)
The former ministers of SUCI in West Bengal:
 Subodh Banarjee: PWD Minister 1967 United Front Government, Labour Minister 1969 United Front Government
 Protiva Mukherjee: PWD Minister 1969 United Front Government

The former MPs of the party were:
 Chitta Roy: Jaynagar (Lok Sabha constituency), West Bengal – The First MP of SUCI(C)
 Dr. Tarun Mandal: Jaynagar (Lok Sabha constituency), West Bengal
The former MLAs of the party were: 
 Subodh Banarjee: Jaynagar constituency, West Bengal – The First MLA of SUCI(C)
 Debaprasad Sarkar: Jaynagar constituency, West Bengal
 Dr. Tarun Kanti Naskar: Jaynagar constituency, West Bengal
 Probodh Purkait: Kultali constituency, West Bengal
 Renupada Halder: Mathurapur constituency, West Bengal
 Rabin Mondal: Patharpratima constituency, West Bengal
 Haripada Bauri: Raghunathpur constituency, West Bengal
 Protiva Mukherjee: Suri constituency, West Bengal
 Bazle Ahmad: Murarai constituency, West Bengal
 Sambhunath Naik: Jashipur constituency, Orissa
Nalini Ranjan Singh: Kanti constituency, Bihar

Mass organisations
The principal mass organisations of SUCI(C) are:
All India United Trade Union Centre
All India Democratic Students Organisation
All India Democratic Youth Organisation
All India Mahila Sanskritik Sanghathan
All India Kisan Khet Majdoor Sangathan

Publications
The central organ of SUCI(C) is the Proletarian Era, an English forthnighly published from Kolkata.

The state committees of the party publishes:
Ganadabi (Bengali weekly, published from Kolkata)
Unity (Malayalam monthly, published from Thiruvananthapuram)
Ganamukti (Assamese fortnightly, published from Guwahati)
Karmika Drushtikona (Kannada monthly, published from Bangalore)
Pattali Chinthanai (Tamil monthly, published from Chennai)
Sarbahara Kranti (Oriya monthly, published from Bhubaneswar)
Sarvahara Dristhikon (Hindi forthnighly, published from Delhi)
Socialist Viplavam (Telugu monthly, published from Hyderabad)
Morcha (Urdu monthly, published from Kolkata)

Criticism
They are often criticized by the other Left parties for supporting a nondemocratic anti-communist party like TMC, to defeat the Left Government. After breaking the alliance with TMC, Provash Ghosh said in a press statement, "The CPI(M) government had turned 'anti-people' therefore it was extremely important to end their 34-year tenure in the state", he also added, "Our main target of dislodging the CPI(M) government has been achieved, and we are no longer an ally of TMC. We are ready to sit in opposition".

References

External links

Marxists Internet Archive: Shibdas Ghosh — Marxists Internet Archive
Proletarian Era — a SUCI publication

 
1948 establishments in India
Political parties established in 1948
Anti-revisionist organizations
Stalinist parties
Communist parties in India